The Manhattan Community Board 11 is a New York City community board encompassing the Manhattan neighborhoods of East Harlem and Randalls Island. It is delimited by the East River on the east, 96th Street on the south, Fifth Avenue and Mount Morris Park on the west, as well as by the Harlem River on the north. It also includes Ward Island Park and Randall Island Park.

Its current Chair is Nilsa Orama and its District Manager is Angel Mescain.

Demographics
As of 2000, the Community Board has a population of 117,743 up from 110,509 in 1990 and 114,569 in 1980. Of them (as of 2000), 8,565 (7.3%) are White non Hispanic, 42,062 (35.7%) are African-American  3,185 (2.7%) Asian or Pacific Islander, 240 (0.2%) American Indian or Native Alaskan, 384 (0.3%) of some other race, 1,964 (1.7%) of two or more race, 61,343 (52.1%) of Hispanic origins. 44.8% of the population benefit from public assistance as of 2009, up from 36.7% in 2000.

References

External links
Official site of the Community Board

Community boards of Manhattan